Curtis Partch (born February 13, 1987) is an American former professional baseball pitcher. He previously played in Major League Baseball (MLB) for the Cincinnati Reds and Pittsburgh Pirates.

Career
Partch attended Merced High School in Merced, California. He was selected in the 49th round of the 2005 MLB Draft by the San Francisco Giants, but he did not sign.

Cincinnati Reds
The Cincinnati Reds drafted Partch in the 26th round of the 2007 MLB draft from Merced College, where he did sign. Partch was assigned to the Gulf Coast Reds, where he pitched in 5 games before being promoted to Advanced Rookie Billings. In 17 games that year (1 start), Partch went 1–0 with a 2.88 ERA and 3 saves, while striking out 26 and  innings pitched.

Partch played 2008 with the Dayton Dragons of the Class A Midwest League, where in 33 games (17 starts), Partch went 5–11 with a 5.00 ERA and 1 save, striking out 74 in  innings. Partch began 2009 with Dayton, before being promoted to Sarasota Reds of the Class A-Advanced Florida State League in August. He also pitched in one game for the Carolina Mudcats of the Class AA Southern League. In 27 starts that year, Partch went 12–9 with a 4.49 ERA, striking out 104 in  innings.

Partch played 2010 with the Lynchburg Hillcats of the Class A-Advanced Carolina League, while pitching one game for Carolina. In 29 total appearances (25 starts), Partch went 7–12 with a 5.33 ERA, striking out 97 in 135 innings. Partch began 2011 with the Bakersfield Blaze of the Class A-Advanced California League, where he made 21 starts before being promoted to Carolina in August, where he finished the year. In 28 total starts, he went 8–13 with a 5.66 ERA, striking out 126 in  innings.

Partch played most of 2012 with the Pensacola Blue Wahoos of the Southern League, although he had a 7-game stint with Bakersfield in late April. In 52 total appearances (4 starts), Partch went 7–4 with a 4.26 ERA and 8 saves, striking out 79 in  innings. After the season, Partch played with the Peoria Javelinas of the Arizona Fall League (AFL), and was elected to the AFL Rising Stars Game, along with fellow Reds outfielder Billy Hamilton. The Reds added Partch to their 40-man roster after the 2012 season.

Partch began 2013 with Pensacola until he was promoted to the Louisville Bats of the Class AAA International League in late April. On June 8, Partch was recalled by the Reds, replacing Logan Ondrusek on the active roster.  On June 9, 2013, Partch made his Major League debut in the 10th inning against the St. Louis Cardinals, giving up a grand slam to Matt Holliday, the first batter he faced.

Partch was non-tendered by the Reds after the 2014 season.

San Francisco Giants
He signed a minor-league deal with the San Francisco Giants for the 2015 season.

Pittsburgh Pirates
He signed with the Pittsburgh Pirates for the 2016 season, and was promoted to the major leagues on June 19.

York Revolution
On April 5, 2017, Partch signed with the York Revolution of the Atlantic League of Professional Baseball.

On November 1, 2017, he became a free agent.

Personal life
He is the great-grandson of experimental composer Harry Partch.

References

External links

1987 births
Living people
People from Merced, California
Baseball players from California
Major League Baseball pitchers
Cincinnati Reds players
Pittsburgh Pirates players
Merced Blue Devils baseball players
Gulf Coast Reds players
Billings Mustangs players
Dayton Dragons players
Carolina Mudcats players
Sarasota Reds players
Lynchburg Hillcats players
Bakersfield Blaze players
Pensacola Blue Wahoos players
Louisville Bats players
Peoria Javelinas players
Sacramento River Cats players
Indianapolis Indians players
York Revolution players